Kevin Claudius Joseph (born 20 December 1978) is a Trinidadian-born former British Virgin Islands cricketer. Joseph was a left-handed batsman.

In 2006, the British Virgin Islands were invited to take part in the 2006 Stanford 20/20, whose matches held official Twenty20 status. Joseph made a single appearance in the tournament against Saint Lucia in a preliminary round defeat, with him being run out for 19 runs opening the batting by the combination of Darren Sammy and Garey Mathurin. He later played for the team in its second appearance in the Stanford 20/20 in 2008, making a single appearance in a preliminary round defeat against Dominica, where he again opened the batting and was dismissed for 5 runs by Raymond Casimir.

References

External links
Kevin Joseph at ESPNcricinfo
Kevin Joseph at CricketArchive

1978 births
Living people
Trinidad and Tobago cricketers
British Virgin Islands cricketers
Trinidad and Tobago emigrants to the British Virgin Islands